Southwest Detroit is a neighborhood within Detroit. Clark Park is a popular park within the Hubbard Farms area of southwest Detroit (not to be confused with the similarly named Clark Park in Philadelphia). It is also well known for Mexicantown, Detroit's vibrant Mexican community.

Economy
Southwest Detroit has many independent grocery stores. In particular Southwest Detroit has several Hispanic supermarkets, or supermercados, that stock meat, specialty produce, and tortillas.

Education
Residents are within Detroit Public Schools and are zoned to Western International High School or Cesar Chavez High school with the added option of attending Detroit Cristo Rey High School which is a private, catholic college prep school. . Previously Southwestern High School was in Southwest Detroit. Southwestern closed in 2012, and students were reassigned to Western.

The current Munger Elementary-Middle School, which opened in 2012, had a cost of $22.2 million.

References

External links

Neighborhoods in Detroit